Cytochrome c-type heme lyase is an enzyme that in humans is encoded by the HCCS gene on chromosome X.

Structure 
The HCCS gene is located on the Xp22 region of chromosome X and encodes a protein that is ~30 kDa in size. The HCCS protein is localized to the inner mitochondrial membrane and is expressed in multiple tissue including prominently in the cardiovascular system and the central nervous system.

Function 

The HCCS protein functions as a lyase to covalently attach the heme group to the apoprotein of cytochrome c on the inner mitochondrial membrane of the mitochondrion. The heme group is required for cytochrome c to transport electrons from complex III to complex IV of the electron transport chain during respiration. Heme attachment to cytochrome c takes place in the intermembrane space and requires conserved heme-interacting residues on HCCS on one of the two heme-binding domains on HCCS, including His154.  The HCCS protein may function to regulate mitochondrial lipid and total mitochondrial mass in response to mitochondrial dysfunctions.

Clinical Significance

Mutations in the HCCS gene cause Microphthalmia with linear skin defects (MLS) syndrome, also known as MIDAS syndrome, microphthalmia, syndromic 7 (MCOPS7), or microphthalmia, dermal aplasia, and sclerocornea. MLS is a rare X-linked dominant male-lethal disease characterized by unilateral or bilateral microphthalmia and linear skin defects in affected females, and in utero lethality for affected males.

References

Further reading

External links
 GeneReview/NIH/UW entry on Microphthalmia with Linear Skin Defects Syndrome